Patrick Gordon of Auchindoun (1538–1594) was a Scottish landowner and rebel.

He was a son of George Gordon, 4th Earl of Huntly and Elizabeth Keith, a daughter of Robert Keith, Master of Marischal, who was killed at the battle of Flodden.

His home was Auchindoun Castle, which he possessed in succession to his brother, Adam Gordon of Auchindoun.

He was also the owner of Gartlie or Haltoun Castle in Banff, also known as Barclay, from 1581, which he gave to his wife Agnes Beaton in 1583.

In April 1589 he was with members of the Gordon family and others who assembled against the king at the Bridge of Dee. John Colville wrote that Auchindoun and other lairds were "obstinate" and not likely to willingly enter the king's peace.

His wife Agnes Beaton came to court to plead on his behalf in June 1590, and made a favorable impression by bringing her daughter, Elizabeth Gordon, the heiress of Gight. An influential courtier, Sir George Home was interested in marrying Elizabeth Gordon. She joined the household of Anne of Denmark. Lady Auchindoun also promised that her husband would produce a copy of the league made at the Bridge of Dee. Auchindoun stayed at Niddry Castle in West Lothian as the guest of Lord Seton in July 1590, hoping to regain royal favour, while his wife was again at court. He got an audience with the king and gave him a copy of a band or league made at the Bridge of Dee in April 1589. The Earl of Huntly had thrown the copy on a fire, and then retrieved it.

In March 1593 Patrick Gordon of Auchindoun was forfeited as a rebel, and Auchindoun Castle regarded as his wife's jointure, was given to Sir George Home, whose wife Elizabeth Gordon was Patrick Gordon's stepdaughter.

In September 1593 the Synod of Fife took action against the Catholic Gordon family and others, excommunicating Auchindoun and the Earl of Huntly. This displeased the king.

In July 1594 there was talk of a compromise between the Catholic nobility in the north and the Scottish Kirk. Auchindoun said to Jean Gordon, Countess of Sutherland he would "wash his hands shortly in the heart-blood of some of the best of the ministers". The Countess drank a toast to him.

Gordon was killed at the battle of Glenlivet on 3 October 1594. He was shot down while charging with the Earl of Erroll at the Earl of Argyll's troops, and it was reported they stabbed him with dirks and cut off his head.

His first wife was Janet Leslie. He married secondly, by July 1583, Agnes Beaton, a daughter of Cardinal David Beaton, Archbishop of St. Andrews, and Marion Ogilvy, the widow of Alexander or George Gordon of Gight.

References

1538 births
1594 deaths
Court of James VI and I
P
People from Aberdeenshire
Younger sons of earls